Kevin Shulman is a producer, writer, and director of music videos and feature films.

Biography

As a director and producer of music videos he has worked with such artists as Jason Derulo, Juicy J, The Game, Omarion, Billy Morrison and Academy Award winners, Three 6 Mafia.

In 2016 Shulman directed the cable television movie Her Dark Past for Lifetime Network. He produced, directed and co-wrote the horror feature I Am Fear which was released on Feb. 20, 2020. The film stars Kristina Klebe, Eoin Macken, Bill Moseley, Faran Tahir, and William Forsythe.

Charlie Says controversy

In 2018 Shulman along with producing partner Jeremy Rosen, produced Charlie Says. The film reunited the American Psycho filmmaking duo of Mary Harron and Guinevere Turner in an unexplored view of the Charles Manson murders. The film focuses on the women in Manson's cult, facing life imprisonment and is based on the books The Family, by Ed Saunders and The Long Prison Journey of Leslie Van Houten, by Karlene Faith. The film premiered at the Venice Film Festival, was nominated for Best Director and is scheduled for theatrical release in 2019 by IFC.

In September 2018 Shulman filed suit in L.A. Superior Court against the other producers of Charlie Says. The suit says they illegally cut his percentage on the film and only gave him credit for a reduced role. Shulman was recovering from cancer at the time.

Selected music videos

Filmography

Awards
Boston International Film Festival
|-
| 2015
| Paddy's in the Boot
| Indie Soul Special Recognition Award
| International Filmmaker Festival of World Cinema, London
|-
| 2015
| Paddy's in the Boot
| Best Director
| 
|-
| 2015
| Paddy's in the Boot
| Best Short Film
|

References

Living people
American film producers
American screenwriters
American television directors
American film directors
Year of birth missing (living people)